Oakhill is a village in Somerset, England.

Oakhill may also refer to:

Oak Hill, New Jersey, United States, also known as Oakhill
Oakhill (Marshall, Michigan), a house listed on the U.S. National Register of Historic Places
Oakhill Brewery, in Oakhill, Somerset, England
Oakhill College, Australia
Oakhill Down Lock, Wiltshire, England
Oakhill Forest, Ontario, Canada
Oakhill Primary School, Stoke-on-Trent, Staffordshire, England
Oakhill School, Whalley, rural Lancashire, England
Oakhill Township, Barnes County, North Dakota, United States

See also
Oak Hill (disambiguation)